India International Centre for Buddhist Culture and Heritage is sponsored by International Buddhist Confederation in Lumbini, Nepal as a world class pilgrimage and tourism attraction.

History 

The Centre construction is funded by Lumbini Development Trust. The centre received an investment of 1 billion Indian Rupees and is expected to take three years to complete, in 2025

Facilities 

India International Centre for Buddhist Culture and Heritage will have following facilities for pilgrims:

 administration office

 place for meditation

 halls for doing regular prayer

 library with collection of many books

 area for cafeteria

 other required facilities like toilets and bathrooms

See also 

 Buddhism in Nepal

References 

Tourist attractions in Nepal
Buddhism in Nepal